Andrew Perrin (born 23 June 1990) is an Australian cricketer. Perrin moved to Tasmania from Victoria in 2016 in order to increase his chances of playing interstate cricket. He made his first-class debut for Tasmania in the 2016–17 Sheffield Shield season on 1 February 2017. After three first class matches, Perrin represented the Tasmanian U23 side in the four-day Futures League for the remainder of the 2017–18 season. In February 2020, Perrin represented the Victorian Second XI in a four day match against the Australian Capital Territory in the Cricket Australia Second XI competition.

References

External links
 

1990 births
Living people
Australian cricketers
Tasmania cricketers
Place of birth missing (living people)